James L. Breese House, also known as "The Orchard", is a historic home located at Southampton in Suffolk County, New York. It was designed as a summer residence between 1897 and 1906 by the prominent architectural firm of McKim, Mead, and White in the Colonial Revival style. An 1858 house original to the site was incorporated into the structure.  It is two and one half stories high and clad with white painted wood shingles. It features a two-story portico, reminiscent of Mount Vernon.

Breese was a close friend of architect Stanford White, commissioning modifications and additions until the latter's death. The home's spectacular 70-foot "music room" is believed to be White's last completed project.

From 1926 to 1956, it was owned by Charles E. Merrill (1885–1956), who deeded it to Amherst College.  Amherst College later sold it to the Nyack School for Boys, which closed in 1977. It is located within the  Southampton Village Historic District.

It was added to the National Register of Historic Places in 1980.

References

Houses on the National Register of Historic Places in New York (state)
Colonial Revival architecture in New York (state)
Houses completed in 1898
Houses in Suffolk County, New York
National Register of Historic Places in Suffolk County, New York